Cedarview Middle School is a dual-track English/French immersion middle school in the Barrhaven neighbourhood of Ottawa, Ontario, Canada.  It is part of the Ottawa-Carleton District Board (OCDSB). Cedarview was opened in 1994. The building is characterized by its bright blue roof. As of the 2022-2023 school year, the principal is Shelley Neill and the vice-principal is Jennifer Stadler. The school is also home to a Grade 7 and 8 Congregated Gifted class and an autism program.

Cedarview holds a world record for Largest Simultaneous Yo-yo, which they broke on June 8, 2006. On June 6th, 2006 the record was attempted by the entire staff and students, and the attempt was successful, beating the previous record by a mere six people. The record was featured in the Canadian edition of the Guinness Book of World Records 2008, in the upper right corner of page 7.Students have also participated in the Annual Cedarview Middle School Walkathon and raised over $96,000 toward help for adults with multiple disabilities. Grade 8 teacher Barbara Troutman was awarded the Ottawa-Carleton District School Board's 2007 Community Award for her role in organising the event to raise funds and awareness within the school and community.

Extra-curricular activities 
The 2004 Cedarview Middle School flag football team won the Reebok NFL/CFL Flag Football national championship tournament at the 92nd Grey Cup in Regina, Saskatchewan. They went on to win the bronze medal at the 2004 NFL Reebok Flag Football World Championship.

References

External links 
School Website

Middle schools in Ottawa
Educational institutions established in 1994
1994 establishments in Ontario